Eirik Bergum Skaasheim (born 22 January 1993) is a Norwegian footballer who plays as a defender for NHH FK.

Career
Skaasheim was born in Balestrand and he started his career with Sogndal.

Skaasheim joined Sogndal in 2011. He made his debut for Sogndal in a 1-1 draw against Start.

Career statistics

References 

1993 births
Living people
People from Balestrand
Norwegian footballers
Sogndal Fotball players
IL Hødd players
Eliteserien players
Norwegian First Division players
Association football defenders
Norway youth international footballers
Norway under-21 international footballers
Sportspeople from Vestland